Tajaraq is a village in Dizajrud-e Sharqi Rural District, Qaleh Chay District, Ajab Shir County, East Azerbaijan Province, Iran. At the 2006 census, its population was 623, with 156 families.

References 

Populated places in Ajab Shir County